Tales of the City (formally Armistead Maupin's Tales of the City) is a 1993 television miniseries based on the first of the Tales of the City series of novels by Armistead Maupin.

To date, the first three books have been adapted into television miniseries; the first, Tales of the City, was produced by the UK's Channel 4 and was first screened in the UK in 1993, then shown on PBS in the US in January 1994. Channel 4 eventually teamed up with the American cable network Showtime to produce the sequel, More Tales of the City, which premiered in the US and UK in 1998.  The third installment of the series, Further Tales of the City, was produced by Showtime (without Channel 4) and was originally aired in the US on Showtime in May 2001.

A fourth installment, Armistead Maupin's Tales of the City, premiered on Netflix on June 7, 2019, with Laura Linney, Olympia Dukakis, Barbara Garrick and Paul Gross reprising their roles.

Premise and release
Following the storyline in Maupin's first book, the first miniseries begins in the summer of 1976, following Mary Ann's decision to remain permanently in San Francisco following her vacation there and spans the next several months, concluding on New Year's Day 1977.

The miniseries premiered on Channel 4 in the UK on 28 September 1993, and was screened by PBS in the US in January 1994. Amid the controversy surrounding the homosexual themes, nudity, and illicit drug use in the miniseries, Tales of the City gave PBS its highest ratings ever for a dramatic programme. In deference to local standards, PBS gave stations the option of showing an edited version in which male and female body parts were obscured by pixelation. The original six-part miniseries was produced by Britain's Channel 4 Television Corporation in conjunction with San Francisco's PBS station KQED and PBS' American Playhouse. Despite the ratings success of Tales of the City, PBS bowed to threats of federal funding cuts and announced it would not participate in the television production of the sequel, More Tales of the City.

Cast and characters

Production
Premium cable channel HBO acquired the rights to the first two Tales of the City books in 1982 in the hopes of turning them into a weekly sitcom. Pre-production began in the fall of that year with a pilot script by Richard Kramer. Kramer described the script as a "Mary Tyler Moore for the '80s". In the face of the rising AIDS epidemic and a changing social climate in the conservative Reagan era, HBO reportedly felt that the book's celebratory attitude toward homosexuality, casual sex and marijuana usage would not be deemed acceptable by the viewing public. The channel considered toning down the stories and making the series a period piece but ultimately decided to scrap the project.

The rights to the first book were later picked up by the British network Channel 4 and US network PBS, who produced it jointly as a six-part series in 1993. It was first shown in the UK in 1993 and in the US in 1994. However, its airing on PBS was controversial, with political figures criticizing the network for airing an LGBT-oriented series. The network backed out of co-producing or airing any follow-up installments.

Reception
In 2005, Entertainment Weekly named Tales of the City one of the ten best miniseries on DVD. Calling Linney the "breakout star," the article called the series "a time capsule that treats its characters with humor, respect, and a sexual frankness (there's some brief nudity) that was uncommon for PBS in 1993 and would be politically impossible there today."

Sequels
Kevin Tierney, a Canadian producer of television films for Showtime with his firm Productions La Fete, later convinced the network to revive production of the series. More Tales and Further Tales were produced in Montreal by Productions La Fete and directed by Pierre Gang, and aired in 1998 and 2001 respectively. Some of the cast of the sequel series remained constant, although other roles were cast or recast with Canadian actors.

Despite the changes in production companies, the same actors played four of the central characters throughout all three miniseries: Laura Linney played Mary Ann Singleton; Olympia Dukakis played the matriarch, Mrs Anna Madrigal; Barbara Garrick played DeDe Halcyon Day; and Billy Campbell (credited as "William Campbell") played Dr Jon Philip Fielding. In addition, Thomas Gibson reprised his Tales role as Beauchamp Day in More Tales and Mary Kay Place, who had a cameo as Prue Giroux in Tales, played that role as a major character in Further Tales. Parker Posey, who played Mary Ann's high school friend Connie Bradshaw in the first series, appears briefly in both the second and third instalments. In More Tales of the City, Paul Hopkins was cast in the role of Mouse, Whip Hubley played Brian, and Nina Siemaszko was Mona. Hopkins and Hubley returned for Further Tales of the City. Armistead Maupin himself made cameo appearances in all three miniseries.

Regarding the recasts of Brian, Mouse and Mona for the sequels, Maupin has said, "Paul Gross was committed to his own TV series, Due South. Chloe Webb had expressed enthusiasm about playing Mona again, but she backed out when the show's producers declined her request to be paid more than the rest of the cast (the show was operating under a 'favored nations agreement' that required leading cast members to be paid equally.) While everyone felt Chloe was important to Tales, she was not more important than Laura Linney, Thomas Gibson, Billy Campbell or Barbara Garrick. Despite the rumors, it is not true that Marcus D'Amico wasn't invited back because of issues surrounding his sexuality. The production team met with Marcus and he expressed 'ambivalence' about returning to the role of Mouse. The director felt it was important to find someone who would enthusiastically embrace the role."

More Tales of the City (1998)

In More Tales of the City, Mona discovers her true heritage when she winds up in a brothel in Nevada, run by Mother Mucca (Jackie Burroughs); on a cruise to Mexico with a lovelorn Michael, Mary Ann falls in love with Burke, a man without a past; DeDe decides to have her babies, much to Beauchamp's chagrin, and meets D'orothea; and Brian begins a rooftop dalliance with a mysterious woman. Events in Tales of the City, like the disappearance of Norman Neal Williams, are resolved, and Mrs. Madrigal reveals her secret to her tenants.

Further Tales of the City (2001)

In Further Tales of the City, Mary Ann has landed a job at a local TV station and finds a story that might make her a reporter; Frannie mourns the apparent loss of her daughter DeDe and grandchildren in the tragedy at Jonestown, until she makes a shocking discovery; Michael dates several men, including a cop, a cowboy, and a movie star; and Prue falls in a love with a mysterious stranger living in a shack in Golden Gate Park. In the miniseries, Mother Mucca visits and introduces Mrs. Madrigal to a handsome, older man, a story line that does not exist in the books but was added for television. There is also a new plot line for Connie Bradshaw which did not feature in the original novel.

Cage Tyler, the movie star with whom Michael has a brief fling, is based on Rock Hudson, who was a friend and lover of Maupin's. In the novel, the character was not named, but was represented by underscores (e.g.  ) wherever his name would have appeared.

Tales of the City (2019)

In June 2017, it was announced that Netflix was developing a revival of the series. In April 2018, it was officially announced that Netflix had given the production a series order. The limited series starred Linney, Garrick and Dukakis reprising their roles of Mary Ann Singleton, DeDe Halycon Day and Anna Madrigal, respectively. Armistead Maupin's Tales of the City premiered on Netflix on June 7, 2019.

Notes

References

External links

San Francisco in Cinema: Tales of the City

1990s American television miniseries
1990s British drama television series
1990s British television miniseries
1993 television films
1993 films
Channel 4 original programming
English-language television shows
Films directed by Alastair Reid
Peabody Award-winning television programs
Tales of the City
Television shows based on American novels
Television series by Working Title Television
Television shows set in San Francisco
Transgender-related television shows
1990s American LGBT-related drama television series
American Playhouse